Fatah Masoud (born 24 September 1989) is a Libyan futsal goalkeeper.

Masoud played for the Libya national futsal team at the 2008 FIFA Futsal World Cup.

Honors 

 Arab Futsal Championship:
 2008

References

1989 births
Living people
Futsal goalkeepers
Libyan men's futsal players